Karimlu (also Romanized as Karīmlū; also known as Hamvār Kand) is a village in Ojarud-e Sharqi Rural District, Muran District, Germi County, Ardabil Province, Iran. At the 2006 census, its population was 86, in 14 families.

References 

Towns and villages in Germi County